Fabián Rodrigo Guevara Arredondo (born June 22, 1968) is a retired Chilean footballer who played as a defender and midfielder during his career. He obtained a total number of twenty caps (one goal) for the Chilean national side, making his debut on April 9, 1991.

Honours

Club
Universidad de Chile
 Primera División de Chile (1): 1994

Colo-Colo
 Primera División de Chile (1): 1996
 Copa Chile (1): 1996

References

1968 births
Living people
Footballers from Santiago
Chilean footballers
Chilean expatriate footballers
Chile international footballers
Association football defenders
1993 Copa América players
1995 Copa América players
Club Deportivo Palestino footballers
Universidad de Chile footballers
C.F. Monterrey players
Colo-Colo footballers
Deportes Concepción (Chile) footballers
Chilean Primera División players
Liga MX players
Chilean expatriate sportspeople in Mexico
Expatriate footballers in Mexico